Kâhta District is a district of Adıyaman Province of Turkey. Its seat is the town Kâhta. Its area is 1,274 km2, and its population is 127,534 (2021). On 12 October 2018, cave drawings which date back to the Paleolithic era, were discovered in the Kâhta district, due to the decline of Atatürk Reservoir waters by 10–15 meters.

Composition
There are 3 municipalities in Kâhta District:
 Akıncılar
 Bölükyayla
 Kâhta

There are 102 villages in Kâhta District:

 Adalı
 Akalın
 Akdoğan
 Akkavak
 Akkuş
 Aktaş
 Akyıldız
 Alidam
 Arılı
 Aydınpınar
 Bağbaşı
 Bağözü
 Ballı
 Belenli
 Belören
 Beşikli
 Boğazkaya
 Bostanlı
 Bozpınar
 Boztarla
 Burmapınar
 Büyükbağ
 Büyükbejyan
 Büyükbey
 Çakıreşme
 Çaltılı
 Çamlica
 Çardak
 Çataltepe
 Çaybaşı
 Çıralık
 Çukurtaş
 Cumhuriyet
 Damlacık
 Dardağan
 Dikenli
 Doluca
 Dumlu
 Dut
 Eceler
 Ekinci
 Elbeyi
 Erikdere
 Erikli
 Esendere
 Eski Kâhta
 Eskitaş
 Fıstıklı
 Geldibuldu
 Göçeri
 Gökçe
 Gölgeli
 Güdülge
 Güzelçay
 Habipler
 Hacıyusuf
 Hamzalar
 Hasandiğin
 Hasköy
 İkizce
 Işıktepe
 İslamköy
 Karacaören
 Karadut
 Karaman
 Karataş
 Kavaklı
 Kayadibi
 Koçtepe
 Köseler
 Kozağaç
 Menzil
 Mülk
 Narince
 Narlıdere
 Narsırtı
 Oluklu
 Ortanca
 Ovacık
 Şahintepe
 Salkımbağı
 Sarısu
 Şenköy
 Sıraca
 Sırakaya
 Susuz
 Taşlıca
 Taşlıçay
 Teğmenli
 Teknecik
 Tuğlu
 Turanlı
 Tütenocak
 Ulupınar
 Yapraklı
 Yelkovan
 Yenice
 Yenikuşak
 Yeşilkaya
 Yolaltı
 Zeytin
 Ziyaret

Places of interest
Nemrut Dağı or Mount Nemrut - now a national park, famous for the antique statuary on the summit, dating back to the Commagene Kingdom.
Karakuş Tumulus, with a large statue of an eagle.
Kâhta castle
Severan Bridge, a Roman bridge.

References

Districts of Adıyaman Province